Tim Jones (born 16 January 1967) is a male retired British swimmer.

Swimming career
Jones competed in the men's 200 metre butterfly at the 1988 Summer Olympics. He represented England in the 200 metres butterfly, at the 1986 Commonwealth Games in Edinburgh, Scotland. Four years later he represented England in the 100 and 200 metres butterfly, at the 1990 Commonwealth Games in Auckland, New Zealand. He also won the 1988 ASA National Championship title in the 200 metres butterfly.

References

External links
 

1967 births
Living people
British male swimmers
Olympic swimmers of Great Britain
Swimmers at the 1988 Summer Olympics
Swimmers at the 1986 Commonwealth Games
Swimmers at the 1990 Commonwealth Games
Sportspeople from Birmingham, West Midlands
Commonwealth Games competitors for England